Kıvanç Karakaş (born 3 March 1985) is a Turkish professional footballer.

External links

1985 births
Living people
People from Üsküdar
Footballers from Istanbul
Turkish footballers
Süper Lig players
Association football midfielders
Eskişehirspor footballers
Sarıyer S.K. footballers
Yalovaspor footballers
Karşıyaka S.K. footballers
Bandırmaspor footballers
Şanlıurfaspor footballers
Çaykur Rizespor footballers
Sivasspor footballers